Immigration to Romania is less common than immigration to most other European Union countries, with Romania having 2.1% of the population foreign born as of 2017 (Eurostat estimates). Of these, 0.9% were born in other EU member states, and 1.2% were born outside the EU. Romania has recently experienced a growing wave of immigration, mostly from the Republic of Moldova, Turkey, Italy, Spain, Southeast Asia, and East Asia and to a lesser extent other parts of the world. In 2013, there were 198,839 immigrants living in Romania, of which 13,000 were refugees. As of mid-2020, the number of migrants in Romania was 705,000, of which over 40% were from the Republic of Moldova.

According to DIICOT, Romania has evolved since 1990 from a country of transit for illegal migrants to a country of destination. Within the European Union, the country has the second highest rate of immigration from non-EU countries (86%), just behind Slovenia (90%). Most immigrants in Romania are from Europe. Among non-European immigrants, most are from Asia and North Africa.

Republic of Moldova

Over 40% of the country's foreign-born residents originate from Republic of Moldova. Owing to the former period of union between most of Moldova and Romania, many Moldovans are eligible for Romanian citizenship on the basis of descent. The culture of Moldova is influenced primarily by the Romanian origins of its majority population, being strongly related to classical Romanian culture, and, as such, it is easy for people from neighbouring Moldova to integrate within the contemporary Romanian culture. Many immigrants from the Republic of Moldova prefer to settle in the Romanian counties from the region of Moldavia, because there the culture is more similar to their home country.

Ukrainians

After the start of the 2022 Russian invasion of Ukraine, a large number of Ukrainians started emigrating into Romania. This also included ethnic Romanians from the country.

EU countries
Immigrants from Italy and Spain often have close relations with Romanians, including intermarriage (see also Romanians in Italy and Romanians in Spain).

Asian and Eastern European workers

In recent years, considerable numbers of Chinese and Vietnamese citizens work in Romania, due to the emigration of a large part of the Romanian workforce.
There are also workers from Nepal, the Philippines, Thailand, Indonesia, India, Bangladesh, Pakistan, Sri Lanka, Ukraine, Serbia, Lebanon, Turkey. Many Chinese live in the Ilfov County (the county surrounding Bucharest).

Many immigrant workers work in constructions; the top countries in 2021 for such construction workers were: Turkey, India, Bangladesh, Vietnam, Nepal, Sri Lanka, Morocco, Moldova, Pakistan, Ukraine. Other countries include Egypt, China, Serbia and Sudan.

Arabs

Arabs in Romania come primarily from Syria (including refugees of the Syrian Civil War), Lebanon, Iraq and Tunisia. In 2018, most asylum applicants were from Iraq, Syria and Iran. In 2020, they were from Afghanistan, Syria and Iraq.

Africans

Africans come primarily to study in Romania. Africans have been studying in Romanian universities since the Communist Era. Most Africans who studied in Romania during the Ceaușescu era came from Sub-Saharan African countries such as Central African Republic, Sudan, DRC, Republic of the Congo, and from Magreb, because Ceaușescu had a plan to educate the African elites in order to create political relations with such African countries. It is estimated that during the communist era, about 10,000 Sudanese young people studied in Romania. 

Currently, in Romania, most Africans are students, refugees, guest workers  or children from mixed-families of a Romanian parent and an African student or worker who came to Romania. In 2020, asylum applicants from Somalia and Eritrea represented the 6th and 9th highest  numbers among asylum applicants in Romania.

Guest workers
In recent years, the Romanian government has approved a quota of 100,000 guest workers per year. Common countries of origin are Turkey, India, Bangladesh, Vietnam, Nepal, Sri Lanka, Morocco, Republic of Moldova, Pakistan, Ukraine, Egypt, China, Serbia, Sudan, Israel, Philippines, Thailand, Indonesia, Somalia, Iraq.  The majority of guest workers are from Asia (these figures do not include EU workers who have freedom of movement).

A 2022 study on Asian guest workers in Romania conducted in Bucharest, Craiova and Cluj-Napoca, among 400 such workers from Asia (which were from the countries of origin of India, Vietnam, Bangladesh, Pakistan, Nepal, Malaysia, Afghanistan, Indonesia, Thailand, Philippines, Cambodia and Laos) found that almost 40% of them worked in constructions, followed by services and logistics & transportation (including warehouse management). Three quarters were men and 60% were aged between 26 and 35 years (average age 27).

In addition to Asia, some workers are from Maghreb, from the Horn of Africa, including Sudan (often working in agriculture), and from neighboring Eastern European countries. Many workers are from Turkey.

Overall, in 2021, the top countries for sending guest workers were Nepal, Turkey, Bangladesh, Sri Lanka, India, Pakistan, Vietnam, Morocco, Republic of Moldova. In 2022, the top countries were Bangladesh, Nepal, Pakistan, Sri Lanka, India, Turkey, Egypt, Morocco and Vietnam.

Refugees

Historically, refugees to Romania have included Armenians who fled the Ottoman Empire due to the Armenian genocide in 1915, Greeks who fled persecution after the Greek Civil War and during the Greek military junta of 1967–74, Koreans who fled the Korean War and Chileans fleeing the Military dictatorship of Chile (1973–90).

Since entering the EU, Romania has also been subject to the migration and asylum policy of the European Union. Romania has, in particular, received refugees from Iraq, Syria and Ukraine.

In 2020, most asylum applicants were from Afghanistan, Syria, Bangladesh, Iraq, Iran, Somalia, Pakistan, Yemen and Eritrea.

Statistics 

Estimate immigrants to Romania (as of mid 2020, including refugees):

 - 285,000;
 - 80,000;
 - 62,000;
 - 43,000;
 - 32,000;
 - 30,000;
 - 22,000;
 - 12,000;
 - 10,000;
 - 10,000;
 - 9,000;
 - 8,000;
 - 7,000;
 - 6,000;
 - 5,000;
 - 5,000;
 - 4,000
 - 3,000;
 - 3,000
 - 3,000;
 - 2,000;
 - 2,000;
 - 2,000;
 - 2,000;
 - 2,000;
 - 2,000;
 - 2,000;
 - 1,000;
 - 1,000;
 - 1,000;
 - 1,000;
 - 1,000;
 - 1,000;
 - 1,000;
 - 1,000;
 - 1,000;
 - 1,000;
 - 1,000;
 - 1,000;
 - 1,000;
 - 1,000;
 - 1,000;
 - 1,000;
 - 1,000;
 - 1,000;
 - 1,000;
 - 600; (2017)
 - 500; (2017)
 - 500. (2017)

See also 

 Immigration to Europe
 Demographics of Romania
 List of countries by immigrant population
 Refugees in Romania

References